The soundtrack for the 2016 American superhero film Deadpool, based on the Marvel Comics character of the same name and distributed by 20th Century Fox, consists of an original score composed by Tom Holkenborg and a series of songs featured in the film. An album featuring these, named Deadpool: Original Motion Picture Soundtrack, was released on February 12, 2016. It reached number 30 on the US Billboard 200, and topped the soundtrack list from Billboard.

Development
In January 2016, Holkenborg confirmed that he would compose the score for Deadpool. The composition mainly utilized 80's synthesizers that added to the immersion.

Holkenborg used an ARP 2600 and a Synclavier, for Deadpool's 'riffs' and battles, while an Oberheim is mainly for more emotional scenes. A complete orchestra was mainly used for Colussus and Negasonic Teenage Warhead, to give feeling and honor from previous films.

Additional songs
The soundtrack also includes "Deadpool Rap" by YouTube personalities TeamHeadKick, featuring updated lyrics that reference the film rather than the video game, "Shoop" by Salt-N-Pepa, "X Gon' Give It to Ya" by DMX, and more.

Release
The soundtrack album was released digitally on February 12, 2016, featuring both Holkenborg's score and the additional songs. Physical copies of the soundtrack became available through Milan Records and Fox Music on March 4, 2016.

Commercial performance
The soundtrack debuted at number 30 on the Billboard 200, selling 18,000 units in the first week.

Track listing
All tracks composed by Holkenborg unless where noted.

Performed by The Hollywood Studio Symphony. Conducted by Nick Glennie-Smith.

Songs not included in the soundtrack, but featured in the film include the following:

 Mukesh — "Mera Joota Hai Japani" (from film Shree 420)
 The Chordettes – "Mr. Sandman"
 Ray Charles – "Hit the Road Jack"
 Flo Rida featuring Sage the Gemini and Lookas – "G.D.F.R."
 Chicago – "You're the Inspiration"

Chart performance

Weekly charts

Year-end charts

References

External links
 
 

2016 soundtrack albums
2010s film soundtrack albums
Junkie XL albums
Deadpool (film series)
Marvel Comics film soundtracks
Milan Records soundtracks